A single-word modifier is one word that modifies the meaning of another word, phrase or clause.

Single-word modifier may refer to:
 Grammatical modifier, a word which modifies another element of the phrase or clause
 Adjective, a word which modifies a noun or pronoun
 Adverb, a word which modifies a verb, adjective, or other word or phrase

See also
 Modifier (disambiguation)
 Compound modifier